The Council elections held in Wolverhampton on Thursday 3 May 1988 were one third, and 20 of the 60 seats were up for election.

During the 1984 election the Labour Party gained the Heath Town ward from the SDP–Liberal Alliance.

Candidates that previously would have stood for the SDP–Liberal Alliance stood with the labels, SDP or Social and Liberal Democrats (Liberal Democrats) in the 1988 local elections.

Election result

1988
1988 English local elections
1980s in the West Midlands (county)